The Estadio Centenario will be an indoor arena in Comodoro Rivadavia, Chubut Province. With 10,000 seats, it will be the largest indoor venue in Patagonia and will host matches of local basketball team Gimnasia y Esgrima de Comodoro Rivadavia, volleyball, handball, tennis matches and concerts.

References 

Indoor arenas in Argentina
Music venues in Argentina
Basketball venues in Argentina
Volleyball venues in Argentina
Chubut Province
Unfinished buildings and structures